Mohibul Hasan Chowdhury (born 26 July 1983) is a Bangladesh Awami League politician. He is the Deputy Minister of Education and a Jatiya Sangsad representing the Chittagong-9 constituency. He is the elder son of veteran Awami politician ABM Mohiuddin Chowdhury.

Early life and education
Chowdhury was born in Chattogram, Bangladesh on 26 July 1983. His father, ABM Mohiuddin Chowdhury, was a Bangladesh Awami League politician who served as the mayor of Chattogram, the second-largest city in Bangladesh. Mohibul Chowdhoury's entry and patronage in politics is connected to his father's career. His mother is Hasina Mohiuddin, who is the incumbent Chattogram City Mohila Awami League (AL) president

Chowdhury graduated from London School of Economics with a law and anthropology degree and was called as a barrister of Lincoln's Inn following post graduation from the University of Law.

Career
Chowdhury was elected to Jatiya Sangsad on 30 December 2018 in 2018 general election from Chittagong-9 as a Bangladesh Awami League candidate. He was appointed as the Deputy Minister of Education in the 4th Cabinet of Sheikh Hasina.

From 2016 to 2019, Chowdhury held the position of "Organising Secretary" of the Awami League's Central Committee. During his tenure in the secretarial body, he helped win the Narayanganj City Corporation Election in 2016 which was the first City election with direct political party nomination in Bangladesh. He was one of the youngest organising secretaries of Awami League and was credited for managing the party in important districts such as Gazipur,  Faridpur, Kishoreganj, Shariatpur, Gopalganj, etc. which districts are considered Awami League heartlands. On 25 June 2018, he apologized to Bangladesh Election Commission for violating electoral code of conduct.

Chowdhury was a partner of The Legal Circle, and an Advocate of the Supreme Court of Bangladesh before his ministerial appointment. On 27 December 2019, he was removed from central executive committee of Awami League as part of the party's strategy to separate the government from the party.

Policy initiatives

From 2022 Education Ministry of Bangladesh is introducing new curriculum at secondary level to make mandatory provision for technical and vocational education. Under the guidance of Prime Minister Sheikh Hasina, Education Minister Dr Dipu Moni, and Deputy Education Minister Mohibul Hassan Chowdhury is leading the transformation effort in light of the 2018 Awami League Election Manifesto. Bangladeshi Deputy Education Minister shared the government reformation plan with Anadolu Agency on 13 October 2021. 
To implement this plan new curriculum is being brought to transform education sector into competency, skill and outcome based education. The government plan includes producing skilled manpower, focusing on specialized universities and importance of moral values in schooling. Mr Chowdhury said the existing education system in Bangladesh mostly fails to assess the skills and efficiency of students, “at the secondary level, we want to provide a minimum standard education in science, humanities, and business studies so that students can grow in line with a profession-based and Outcome-based education, with a reformed evaluation/assessment process ” he continued.

On 9 April 2021, Chowdhury said that the Bangladesh government might reconsider recognizing the highest degree from Qwami Madrassa Board if teaching of extreme religious interpretation is not regulated and basic academic standards are not met.

Ministry of Education in Bangladesh is in the process of rolling out a new school curriculum with a view to achieve newly promoted political and economic objective, "Smart Bangladesh". Regarding this new curriculum, Deputy Minister of Education Mohibul Chowdhury stressed the need to promote reading habits, implememt continuous assessment methods and integrate essential soft skills and vocational education skills instead of conventional memory based public exam based assessments.

Controversy

Some of the activists of Bangladesh Chhatra League, Jubo League and Awami League from Chattogong claim that Mohibul, whose nickname is Nowfel, is their current political mentor after his father ABM Mohiuddin Chowhdury has passed away. In Chittagong University, two factional groups of Chhatra League activists, who claim to be Mohibul's followers, calling them Chose Friends with Care (CFC) and Bijoy group, routinely attempt to dominate the campus against A J M Nasir Uddin backed VFX group. Mohibul has vehemently distanced himself from such group formations in his name and everything that is done inappropriately using his name.

Political Analysts also have pointed out these political rifts between different groups in local politics of Chittagong dates back from the time of Mohibul's father ABM Mohiuddin Chowdhury and Akhtaruzzaman Chowdhury Babu who led two factions and had disagreements with each other and Mohibul is merely blamed for something that was ongoing before he even joined politics.  Conflict and competition between AJM Nasir Uddin faction who claimed to have inherited Akhtaruzzaman Babu's faction  and A. B. M. Mohiuddin Chowdhury followers has been on going for a long time.

Factional divide in local Awami League that began in 1980s also exist in Chittagong Medical College Hospital amongst groups of Doctors and Medical professionals as well. In October 2021, a medical student claiming to belong to Mohibul supported group was so badly beaten by rival group belonging to AJM Nasir Uddin supported Dr Faisal Iqbal Chowdhoury group during a clash, that his skull cracked open. Intern Doctors, medical students claiming to be his followers and followers of AJM NAsir Uddin clashed multiple times which caused serious injury to multiple members of the Chhatra League. In July 2022 Intern Doctors who claim to be close to Mohibul alleged to have assaulted two nurses of Chittagong Medical College Hospital after they had trivial disagreement with Nurse leaders over care of burn injury patients as the nurses were not responding to doctor's & patients' call for help.

Beside distancing himself from all criminal activities done in his or in his late father's name, Mohibul has frequently warned criminal elements within Chhatro League activists or those who claim to be part of teh student organisation, as well as general students, that they will continue to face full academic and legal consequences if they continue their violent and criminal activities and he will never condone or support them.

In February 2023, Avijit Das a Chhatra League cadre/activist and a medical student along with his fellow students who were alleged to be unverified followers of Mohibul tortured 4 students of Chittagong Medical College to the extent that 2 of them were admitted in ICU. Avijit admitted of 'quizzing' them only but journalists have found them in critical condition with marks all over the body. Mohibul never condoned the act, nor did he take any action despite being the education minister. (reference cited in this statement does not say he did not condone, therefore is possibly an attempted vandalism/wrong information by rivals). Following this incident Mohibul has condoned and criticized all criminal acts done using his or his political party's name in either the Chittagong Medical College or in any other institution and called for impartial investigation against all alleged criminal offences. (referred news story published in The Daily Purbokone citing his Facebook verified page). 

In November 2020, after a nationwide violent & bloody protest in Bangladesh by Islamic Conservative groups; Hefazat Islam, Islamic Shashontontro andolon and others, opposing sculptures of Sheikh Mujibur Rahman, Mohibul warned extremists elements that his Awami League government has the capacity to be inclusive by embracing them along the shoulder, But if they cross limit and continue to cause havoc, Government also has the capacity to twist their necks and eliminate them.

References

Living people
1983 births
People from Chittagong
Awami League politicians
11th Jatiya Sangsad members